Eugene the Jeep is a character in the Popeye comic strip. A mysterious animal with magical  or supernatural abilities, the Jeep first appeared in the March 16, 1936 Thimble Theatre comic strip (now simply Popeye). He was also present in animated versions of Popeye's adventures, including three of the Fleischer Studios shorts of the late 1930s/early 1940s, with more extensive appearances in later Popeye cartoons produced for TV.

Fictional character biography

Origin
In the August 9, 1936, strip, headlined "Wha's a Jeep?"  Popeye asks Professor Brainstine what exactly a Jeep is. He gets the following response:

When asked if he had any further questions, Popeye, totally unenlightened by this explanation, repeated, "Wha's a Jeep?"

The animated cartoons took the straightforward approach of defining the character as some type of dog. In The Jeep (1938), Popeye presents the animal to Olive Oyl and Swee'Pea with the simple explanation, "The Jeep's a magical dog and can disappear and things". In Popeye Presents Eugene the Jeep (1940), it is Popeye who receives the creature from Olive, in a box via a special delivery man (voiced by Pinto Colvig), and with the premise that he had never seen the creature before: "Well, blow me down! A baby puppy!"

Eugene the Jeep appeared in several Popeye TV series, including Popeye the Sailor (1960-1963), The All-New Popeye Hour (1978-1983) and Popeye and Son (1987). In the latter two series he was voiced by Don Messick.

Eugene the Jeep did not appear in the live-action  1980 Popeye movie.
The Jeep was included in early drafts of the original screenplay but was soon deemed too difficult and too expensive to render believably, so the character was dropped and elements of the character were given to Swee'Pea. The baby's mysterious ability to answer questions and make predictions through the use of whistles were scenes originally written for Eugene the Jeep.

Eugene was slated to appear in the animated Popeye film produced by Sony Pictures Animation but production of the film was cancelled in 2016.

Attributes and abilities
In the context of the comic strip, Eugene the Jeep was a gift to Popeye's girlfriend Olive Oyl from her Uncle Ben who found Eugene in Africa. The Jeep is a yellow creature about the size of a dog who walks on his hind legs. He has a bear-like head and ears but a large nose, long tail, and protruding belly. The Jeep's diet consists only of orchids.

As his language is limited to the word "jeep", Eugene primarily communicates through body language. Eugene always tells the truth, even to criminals. He possesses high intelligence, so is able to help humans such as Popeye and Olive Oyl solve complex problems. He makes use of a limited form of teleportation: he can disappear from one place and reappear in another, and can walk through and on walls and ceilings. These teleportation powers are said to stem from the Jeep's ability to cross into the fourth dimension.
He also appears in “Popeye & Son” later.

Other uses
Eugene the Jeep is the school mascot for Northeast Dubois High School in Dubois, Indiana, and South Webster High School in South Webster, Ohio, although the Jeep for Northeast Dubois is blue and gray, while South Webster's is red instead of yellow.  An old elementary school in Wheatland, Indiana also used the Jeep as its mascot, but this school was consolidated, and the symbol is no longer in use.

Many suggest that soldiers of World War II were so impressed with the new Willys MB light utility vehicle that they informally named it after Eugene the Jeep, as it was "small, able to move between dimensions and could solve seemingly impossible problems".
Other supposed origins for the vehicle's namesake include GP ('General Purpose'), and the dubious JEEP ('Just Engine & Essential Parts'.)

Notes

External links
  Popeye at Don Markstein's Toonopedia

Comics characters introduced in 1936
Comics characters who can teleport
Popeye characters
Fictional mammals
Fictional characters who can turn invisible
Fictional characters who can turn intangible
Male characters in animation
Male characters in comics